Robert Findlay (1859–1951) was a Scottish-Canadian architect.

Robert Findlay may also refer to:
Robert Findlay (minister)  (1721–1814), Scottish minister
Robert Findlay (footballer) (1877–1926), Scottish football (soccer) player
Robert Findlay (umpire), Australian rules football umpire

See also
Robbie Findley (born 1985), American soccer player
Robert Finlay, 1st Viscount Finlay, British lawyer and politician
Robert Finley (disambiguation)